Johan Lisabeth (born 25 June 1971 in Tielt, West Flanders) is a retired Belgian athlete who specialised in the high hurdles. He represented his country at the 1996 Summer Olympics, reaching the semifinals, and 1995 World Championships, reaching the second round.

His personal bests are 13.53 seconds in the 110 metres hurdles (Atlanta 1996) and 7.69 seconds in the indoor 60 metres hurdles (Ghent 1996).

Competition record

References

1971 births
Living people
Belgian male hurdlers
Athletes (track and field) at the 1996 Summer Olympics
Olympic athletes of Belgium
People from Tielt
World Athletics Championships athletes for Belgium
Sportspeople from West Flanders